Robert Arthur Huttenback (March 8, 1928 in Frankfurt am Main, Germany – June 10, 2012, Camarillo, California) was the third Chancellor of UC Santa Barbara from 1977 to 1986. He was ousted from the post in July 1986 after allegations that he and his wife Freda had embezzled more than $170,000 from the university to perform renovations on their home.  After two UC presidents (David P. Gardner and David S. Saxon) testified against him, Huttenback and his wife were convicted by a Santa Maria jury in July 1988.

Huttenback was a German Jew whose family fled to England in 1933 when he was a young boy.  Although his family lived in England for only about six years before moving again to the United States, Huttenback spoke English with a British accent for the rest of his life.

Huttenback received his B.A. in 1951 and his Ph.D. with a historical dissertation in 1959, both from the University of California, Los Angeles.  Before returning to UCLA to earn his doctorate, Huttenback served in the U.S. Army during the Korean War.  From 1960 to 1977, he was a professor at the California Institute of Technology. He was a lifelong specialist in the history of British imperialism.

Huttenback initially blocked the tenureship of Jenijoy La Belle, who became Caltech's first female professor when his decision was overturned.

Sources
Andreas W. Daum, Hartmut Lehmann, and James J. Sheehan, eds., The Second Generation: Émigrés from Nazi Germany as Historians. With a Biobibliographic Guide, New York: Berghahn Books, 2016, pp. 13, 34, 36, 384‒85.

References

External links
 Biography on UC History Digital Archives

Chancellors of the University of California, Santa Barbara
1928 births
2012 deaths